Brauro Cove (‘Ivaylov Zaliv’ \i-'vay-lov 'za-liv\) is the 1.93 km wide cove indenting for 620 m the northwest coast of Snow Island in the South Shetland Islands, Antarctica. It is entered southwest of Mezdra Point and northeast of Irnik Point.

The feature is named after the Thracian goddess Brauro.

Location
British mapping in 1968, Bulgarian in 2009 and 2017.

Maps
 Livingston Island to King George Island. Scale 1:200000. Admiralty Chart 1776. UK Hydrographic Office, 1968
 L.L. Ivanov. Antarctica: Livingston Island and Greenwich, Robert, Snow and Smith Islands. Scale 1:120000 topographic map.  Troyan: Manfred Wörner Foundation, 2009.  
 L.L. Ivanov. Antarctica: Livingston Island and Smith Island. Scale 1:100000 topographic map. Manfred Wörner Foundation, 2017. 
 Antarctic Digital Database (ADD). Scale 1:250000 topographic map of Antarctica. Scientific Committee on Antarctic Research (SCAR). Since 1993, regularly upgraded and updated

Notes

References
 Brauro Cove. SCAR Composite Gazetteer of Antarctica
 Bulgarian Antarctic Gazetteer. Antarctic Place-names Commission. (details in Bulgarian, basic data in English)

External links
 Brauro Cove. Adjusted Copernix satellite image

Coves of the South Shetland Islands
Bulgaria and the Antarctic